Got to Be There is the debut solo studio album by American singer Michael Jackson, released by Motown on January 24, 1972, four weeks after the Jackson 5's Greatest Hits (1971). It includes the song of the same name, which was released on October 7, 1971, as Jackson's debut solo single. 

On August 2, 2013, the album was certified Gold by the Recording Industry Association of America (RIAA) for sales of over 500,000 copies. The album was later remastered and reissued in 2009 as part of the 3-disc compilation Hello World: The Motown Solo Collection.

Album information
The title track and "Rockin' Robin" were released as singles and were commercially successful. Jackson's "I Wanna Be Where You Are" reached  on the U.S. chart on June 24, 1972. The album included remakes of Bill Withers' "Ain't No Sunshine", Carole King's "You've Got a Friend" and The Supremes' "Love Is Here and Now You're Gone". In the U.K, Jackson's version of "Ain't No Sunshine" was the album's third single; it reached number 8 on that country's charts. The album's songs have a tempo ranging from 74 beats per minute on "Ain't No Sunshine", to 170 on "Rockin' Robin".

The album was arranged by The Corporation, Eddy Manson, James Anthony Carmichael, Gene Page, and Dave Blumberg. Berry Gordy was the executive producer and Jim Britt was credited for photography.

Critical reception 

Rolling Stone (12/7/1972, p. 68) - "...slick, artful and every bit as good as the regular Jackson 5 product...a sweetly touching voice...innocence and utter professionalism...fascinating and finally irresistible..."

Commercial performance
On August 2, 2013, the album was certified Gold by the Recording Industry Association of America (RIAA) for sales of over 500,000 copies. The album was later remastered and reissued in 2009 as part of the 3-disc compilation Hello World: The Motown Solo Collection. The album sold over 1.5 million copies worldwide.

Track listing

Charts

Certifications

References

External links
 

1972 debut albums
Michael Jackson albums
Motown albums
Albums arranged by Gene Page
Albums produced by Hal Davis
Albums produced by the Corporation (record production team)